Wallia or Walha (Spanish: Walia, Portuguese Vália), ( 385 – 418) was king of the Visigoths from 415 to 418, earning a reputation as a great warrior and prudent ruler. He was elected to the throne after Athaulf and then Sigeric were assassinated in 415.

Biography
Early on, Wallia made peace with Emperor Honorius and accepted a treaty with the Roman Empire. He also returned Honorius' sister Galla Placidia to him. As gains from these arrangements, Wallia was granted Aquitaine in 417 as a region where the Visigoths would be based as official allies or foederati. He established his court in Toulouse, which became the Visigothic capital for the rest of the fifth century.

In 418 he honored the alliance by invading Hispania, where his army destroyed the Siling Vandals and so reduced the numbers of Alans living there that the survivors placed themselves under the rule of Gunderic, king of the Asding Vandals.

Some historical sources say that he was related to Alaric only by marriage. He was succeeded by Alaric's illegitimate son or son-in-law Theodoric. Wallia's daughter married Rechila, King of the Suevi, and was the mother of Ricimer and the mother-in-law of Gundowech, King of the Burgundians.

Wallia is sometimes assumed to have been the historical model for the legendary figure of Walter of Aquitaine.
 
It is unclear where or when Wallia died as there is no source on the topic. After invading Hispania he seems to have died, either in Battle or by some unknown cause. Theodoric I’s reign begins in 418, but it is not said when in that year Theodoric had succeeded Wallia.

External links
Edward Gibbon, History of the Decline and Fall of the Roman Empire, chapter 31

418 deaths
Balt dynasty
Gothic warriors
5th-century Visigothic monarchs
Year of birth unknown